The Women's Pole Vault event at the 2010 South American Games was held on March 22 at 17:00.  The competition did not meet the requirement for the minimum number of 4 participating nations to be eligible for the South American Games.  However, it could not be retrieved whether the event counted solely for the South American Under-23 Championships or not.

Medalists

Records

Results
Results were published.

Final

See also
2010 South American Under-23 Championships in Athletics

References

External links
Final

Pole Vault W